The Large Molecule Heimat is a dense gas cloud located in the molecular cloud Sagittarius B2.  Many species of molecule, including aminoacetonitrile (a molecule related to glycine), ethyl formate, and butyronitrile, have been detected in the Large Molecule Heimat.

References 

Milky Way
Astrochemistry
Sagittarius (constellation)